David Thackeray (born 16 November 1902) was a Scottish footballer, who played as a left half for Alloa Athletic, Motherwell and Portsmouth.

Thackeray represented the Scottish League once, in October 1927. Portsmouth signed him from Motherwell in the following year for £3,500. He played for Portsmouth in the FA Cup Finals of 1929 and 1934, both of which were lost.

References

1902 births
Year of death missing
Association football wing halves
Scottish footballers
Alloa Athletic F.C. players
Motherwell F.C. players
Portsmouth F.C. players
Scottish Football League players
Scottish Football League representative players
English Football League players
Footballers from Hamilton, South Lanarkshire
FA Cup Final players